Dialectica sanctaecrucis is a moth of the family Gracillariidae. It is known from Cuba, the Dominican Republic, Jamaica, Puerto Rico, the Virgin Islands (Saint John, Saint Croix and Saint Thomas) and the Galápagos Islands.

The larvae feed on Solanum melongena and Solanum torvum. They probably mine the leaves of their host plant.

Subspecies
Dialectica sanctaecrucis sanctaecrucis
Dialectica sanctaecrucis darwini Landry, 2006 (Galápagos Islands)

References

Dialectica (moth)
Moths described in 1897